People's Pond is a man-made pond feature in Mahammadpur Turi, Vaishali District, Bihar, India. At the present time flower and fruit trees is planted around it, Which is makes it beautiful.

References 

Vaishali district